The Maluri station is an integrated light rapid transit (LRT) and mass rapid transit (MRT) located on the eastern fringe of Kuala Lumpur near and named after Taman Maluri (Malay; English: Maluri Garden), a residential housing estate. The station is located along Federal Route 1 Jalan Cheras (English: Cheras Road) opposite the AEON Taman Maluri shopping centre and Sunway Velocity Mall. The Kerayong River also runs beside the station.

The station consists of an elevated station served by the Ampang Line (formerly known as STAR LRT) which was opened in 1996, and the underground station served by the Kajang Line which was opened on 17 July 2017. Both stations are connected via a paid-area-to-paid-area elevated pedestrian linkway.

Under the station naming rights granted by Mass Rapid Transit Corporation Sdn Bhd (MRT Corp), the MRT station is currently known as AEON–Maluri MRT station.

Station Background

Colonial era
During British colonial era and until the 1980s, the site of the present-day Maluri station was a halt on the KTMB network called Pudoh Ulu or Pudu Ulu.

LRT Ampang Line station
The older elevated station serves the LRT Ampang Line which is built according to the standard design of the Ampang Line elevated stations.

It consists of two side platforms flanking the double elevated tracks, above a concourse level where the fare gates are located. Both platforms can be reached from the concourse level via stairways and escalators. Previously, there were no elevators, and hence, the station was not disabled-friendly until they were fitted in 2015.

MRT Kajang Line station
The MRT station is one of the seven underground stations of the MRT Sungai Buloh-Kajang Line. The underground station is built directly beneath Jalan Cheras. The station has two underground levels - a concourse level with fare gates, customer service office, toilets and machinery rooms -  and a platform below with an island platform configuration.

The theme given for the design of the station is "New Generation" and features colourful panels on the exterior and interior walls of the station.

The MRT station is the last underground station before the line resurfaces and heads towards Kajang.

LRT-MRT Linkway
The Maluri station comprises two separate station buildings which are connected via an elevated linkway.
An elevated linkway connecting the paid areas of both the LRT and MRT stations allows commuters to transfer seamlessly between the LRT Ampang Line and the MRT Sungai Buloh-Kajang Line at this station.

The linkway was built together with the MRT station. It connects the LRT station at the paid area of the concourse level while at the MRT station, the linkway connects directly to Entrance C which is located one level above ground level. From Entrance C, escalators, a lift and staircase go directly down to the paid area of the underground concourse level.

As the linkway is part of the paid area of both stations, there are no direct exits to/from the outside. Unlike the MRT station, the linkway is not air-conditioned.

Station Layout 
This station has almost similar layout to  Pasar Seni station. The differences are:

 The LRT station is side platform instead of island platform.
 There is no extra level for plant room (i.e. B3 in Pasar Seni) for the MRT station.

Exits and entrances 
Maluri station has a total of 4 entrances/exits - Entrances A, B and D are at both sides of Jalan Cheras, all of them belong to the MRT station. Entrance C is the given name for the paid-to-paid pedestrian link bridge between the LRT and MRT stations and is not an entrance from outside. There is one entrance only for the LRT station which is also linked to Jalan Cheras. The bus stops are accessible via Entrance B, D and also the LRT station entrance.

History

KTM Ampang branch line
The alignment of the LRT Ampang Line at this location uses the alignment of the old Federated Malay States Railways tracks which ran from Ampang Junction, where the Ampang branch line left the West Coast Main Line (between today's Chan Sow Lin LRT station and Miharja LRT station) to head to the branch line terminus at Ampang town (where today's Ampang Line depot and Ampang LRT station is located).

This branch line was opened on 1 May 1914 and was mostly to cater to the tin mines in the Ampang area. However, no railway station is known to have existed at this location during this period.

The tracks crossed Jalan Cheras as a level crossing until the alignment was converted for the construction of the LRT in the 1990s where a railway bridge was built over the road.

LRT Ampang Line station
The LRT station was constructed as part of the development of the STAR LRT project in the 1990s. It was completed and opened together with the line on 16 December 1996, along with 13 other stations between the Sultan Ismail and the Ampang.

The line was the first LRT line to be operational in Malaysia.

MRT Kajang Line station 
Construction of the underground MRT station began in 2012 following the official launch of the construction of the MRT Kajang Line. The station is located beneath Jalan Cheras. As a result, throughout the construction of the station, various diversions of the road had to be carried out. Decking above the work site was also erected to enable traffic to run while station box excavation and other construction work proceeded underneath.

The station was opened on 17 July 2017 together with the opening of Phase Two of the MRT line from Muzium Negara MRT station to Kajang MRT station.

Bus Services

MRT Feeder Bus Services 
There is no MRT feeder bus services which starts or ends at this station. However, the station provides some other MRT feeder bus services from other stations.

Other Bus Services 
The Maluri station also provides accessibility for some other bus services.

Nearby 
 AEON Taman Maluri Shopping Centre
 Sunway Velocity Mall
 Rapid Bus Maluri Depot
 IPD Cheras

Gallery

LRT Station

MRT Station

LRT-MRT Linkway

See also
MRT Sungai Buloh-Kajang Line
LRT Ampang Line
Maluri

References

External links 
 Kuala Lumpur MRT Integration website
 Maluri MRT station at official website

Rapid transit stations in Kuala Lumpur
Sungai Buloh-Kajang Line
Railway stations opened in 2017
Ampang Line